Jaensch is a surname. Notable people with the surname include:

Chelsea Jaensch (born 1985), Australian athlete specialising in the long jump
Dean Jaensch (born 1936), Australian political scientist and a retired Professor of Political and International Studies
George Jaensch (1872–1958), Australian Overland Telegraph operator and post master
Matthew Jaensch (born 1989), Australian rules football player
Roger Jaensch (born 1971), Australian politician